Ashley Baerg (born October 23, 1989) is a Canadian Paralympic wheelchair basketball player from Saskatoon, Saskatchewan who won 2 bronze medals for both 2007 and 2011 Canada Games.

References

1989 births
Living people
Paralympic wheelchair basketball players of Canada
Canadian women's wheelchair basketball players
Sportspeople from Saskatoon